The Combined New Australia Party was a minor Australian political party that contested the 1990 federal election, but with little success.

References

Defunct political parties in Australia
Political parties with year of establishment missing
Political parties with year of disestablishment missing